Real Sociedad Deportiva Alcalá is a Spanish football team based in Alcalá de Henares in the Community of Madrid. Founded in 1929 it plays in Tercera División RFEF – Group 7, holding home matches at Estadio Municipal del Val, with a capacity of 8,000.

History 
Alcalá de Henares, being a city of students, has a long football history. With the influence of the capital proximity where football was played long before, in 1908 appeared Alcalá Foot-Ball Club.

Season to season

20 seasons in Segunda División B
37 seasons in Tercera División
1 season in Tercera División RFEF

Notable former players
The following players have played at least 100 league games for the club:
 Julio
 Óscar Quesada
 Dani Torres

See also
RSD Alcalá B, reserve team

References

External links
Official website 
Futbolme team profile 

 
Football clubs in the Community of Madrid
Association football clubs established in 1929
1929 establishments in Spain
A